Hit Radio 87.6 is a contemporary hit radio station situated in North Central Victoria.

About Hit Radio 87.6 
The radio station is oriented to the youth market segment in Central Victoria, and as such presents a mix of current chart hits, dance/club chart music, new releases and 90's flashbacks.

Hit Radio is presently finalising transmission site arrangements for new services in neighbouring townships.

Programs and On Air Sound 
HIT Radio is a newly established service designed to provide an alternate hit / dance / house format for younger listeners in smaller regional centres in Victoria. The programs have gone through a number of changes in the last 24 months however have settled with a range of popular weekly features, and a solid format of chart hits, new releases and dance/house music.

Development of Network 
The second transmitter location for Hit Radio is being planned for Kilmore. Details of the test transmissions will be announced in the coming months. Future stations are speculated to include Heathcote (Central Victoria), and two suburban low power licences in the Inner South and Inner East of Melbourne.

External links 

Radio stations in Victoria